Frank Maloney may refer to:

 Kellie Maloney (birth name Frank; born 1953), British boxing promoter
 Frank Maloney (American football) (born 1940), American football player and coach
 Frank Richard Maloney (1945–2009), American poet

See also
Francis Maloney (disambiguation)